Carlos Campos may refer to:

Carlos Campos (equestrian) (born 1931), Portuguese Olympic equestrian
Carlos Campos (footballer, born 1937), Chilean footballer
Carlos Campos (canoeist) (born 1978), Brazilian sprint canoeist
Carlos Luis Campos (born 1980), light flyweight boxer from Venezuela
Carlos de Campos (1866–1927), Brazilian politician
Carlos Campos (clothing brand) (born 1972), New York-based fashion brand
Carlos Campos (footballer, born 1992), Mexican footballer
Carlos Campos (politician) (died 2018), Venezuelan politician and trade union leader

Campos, Carlos